Mansurabad-e Sofla (also Romanized as Manşūrābād-e Soflá; also known as Manşūrābād-e Pā’īn) is a village in Rostam-e Do Rural District, in the Central District of Rostam County, Fars Province, Iran. At the 2006 census, its population was 245, in 46 families.

References 

Populated places in Rostam County